Second-seeded Yayuk Basuki won in the final 6–4, 6–2 against Kyōko Nagatsuka.

Seeds
A champion seed is indicated in bold text while text in italics indicates the round in which that seed was eliminated.

  Wang Shi-ting (withdrew)
  Yayuk Basuki (champion)
  Pam Shriver (semifinals)
  Alexandra Fusai (first round)
  Romana Tedjakusuma (second round)
  Fang Li (quarterfinals)
  Misumi Miyauchi (quarterfinals)
  Kyōko Nagatsuka (final)

Draw

External links
 Official results archive (ITF)
 Official results archive (WTA)

Singles
1994 in Chinese tennis